Pysen is a small skerry in Lindesnes municipality in Agder county, Norway.  To the south of the small island of Skjernøy, the  rock is the southernmost point of Norway proper.

See also
List of islands of Norway
Extreme points of Norway

References

Islands of Agder
Lindesnes
Skerries